Domashnevo is a rural locality (a village) in Nagornoye Rural Settlement, Petushinsky District, Vladimir Oblast, Russia. The population was 29 as of 2010. There are 3 streets.

Geography 
Domashnevo is located on the Klyazma River, 26 km southwest of Petushki (the district's administrative centre) by road. Lugovoy is the nearest rural locality.

References 

Rural localities in Petushinsky District